Neozeleboria is a genus of tiphiid wasp in the order Hymenoptera, first described in 1910 by Sievert Allen Rohwer. The type species is Thynnus sexmaculata .

Species
Species found in Australia are:

 Neozeleboria ada 
 Neozeleboria alexandri 
 Neozeleboria calcaratus 
 Neozeleboria carinicollis 
 Neozeleboria compar 
 Neozeleboria cryptoides 
 Neozeleboria femoratus 
 Neozeleboria flavicoxa 
 Neozeleboria lacteimaculata 
 Neozeleboria adelpha 
 Neozeleboria laevifrons 
 Neozeleboria longicornis 
 Neozeleboria monticola 
 Neozeleboria nitidula 
 Neozeleboria olivei 
 Neozeleboria polita 
 Neozeleboria proxima 
 Neozeleboria rarum 
 Neozeleboria rufum 
 Neozeleboria sexmaculata 
 Neozeleboria sodalis 
 Neozeleboria tabulata 
 Neozeleboria trivialis 
 Neozeleboria impatiens 
 Neozeleboria usitatum 
 Neozeleboria volatilis

References

Thynnidae
Hymenoptera genera
Animals described in 1910
Taxa named by Sievert Allen Rohwer